"Rumo ao Sul" is a single by Ana Moura from the album Leva-me aos Fados. It was released on February 20, 2010 in Portugal.

Recording and production
In 2009, Moura began recording rough demos at World Village studios in Lisbon, Portugal.
The demos consisted of Moura's lyrical ideas over various backing tracks. The demos were later rearranged and real instruments were added to replace the samples or keyboards initially emulating them. All string and orchestral arrangements were recorded at World Village studios in Lisbon by Ana Moura and Jorge Fernando. The song was mixed at the studios by Jorge Fernando.

Music video
The music video follows the aesthetics of the previous music videos from this album.

Official versions
 Album version - 3:51
 Single version - 3:51

References

External links
 Music Video at YouTube

2010 singles
2010 songs